The Bassist!, is an album by jazz bassist Sam Jones recorded in 1979 and released on the Interplay label.

Reception 

The Allmusic review called it "well played post-bop music" and states "Virtually all of Sam Jones' occasional dates as a leader featured him in a purely supportive role with a medium-size all-star group. This set is a bit different, for Jones is often in the forefront, heading a trio".

Track listing 
All compositions by Sam Jones except where noted
 "Rhythm-a-Ning" (Thelonious Monk) – 5:27
 "Lily" – 6:07
 "Seascape" (Kenny Barron) – 7:02
 "Tragic Magic" (Barron) – 6:02
 "The Hymn of Scorpio" – 5:05
 "Bittersweet" – 5:04

Personnel 
Sam Jones – bass
Kenny Barron – piano 
Keith Copeland – drums

References 

Sam Jones (musician) albums
1979 albums
Interplay Records albums